Tore Tønne (5 March 1948 – 20 December 2002) was the Norwegian Minister of Health and Social Affairs (responsible for social affairs) from 2000 to 2001 in Jens Stoltenberg's first cabinet. Tønne committed suicide after newspaper writings about investigations over alleged economic improprieties committed after the conclusion of his term in the Norwegian cabinet. This incident led to a debate about media responsibility and individual rights in Norway.

Ivar Hippe wrote a book about him entitled Mektig og avmektig: Tore Tønne, media og maktspillet bak kulissene.

References

External links 
 Master thesis: When the powerful become powerless (Norwegian)

1948 births
2002 deaths
Labour Party (Norway) politicians
Ministers of Health and Care Services of Norway
Norwegian politicians who committed suicide
Suicides in Norway